The Roland JX-305 Groovesynth synthesizer was produced in 1998 by Roland.  It is very similar to a Roland MC-505 with an additional set of 61 keys. The keyboard is sensitive to velocity and has channel aftertouch. This keyboard was aimed at producers of dance and trance music and was during the late 90s also popular for live performances.

The synth has 9 MIDI control knobs and a 2 line LCD display.

Specifications 
Keyboard
61 keys (with velocity & channel aftertouch)

Maximum Polyphony
64 voices

Patches
Presets: 640
User: 256
Card: 512

Rhythm Sets
Preset: 32
User: 20
Card: 20

Effects
Reverb
Delay
Multi-effect

Sequencer
Tracks: 8 + Mute Control Track
Resolution: 96 ticks per quarter note
Tempo: 20.0 - 240.0
Songs: 50

Patterns
Presets: 274
RPS: 494
User: 200 (maximum)
Card: 200 (maximum)

Maximum Note Storage
Internal: approximately 75,000 notes
Card (option 2mb): approximately 220,000 notes
Card (option 4mb): approximately 440,000 notes

Quantize
Grid
Shuffle
Groove (71 types)

Arpeggiator
53 styles

RPS Set
60

Display
LCD: 16 characters, 2 lines, beat LED

Connectors
Output Jacks (L(Mono), R)
Phones Jack
MIDI Connectors (In, Out, Thru)
Pedal Hold Jack
Pedal Control Jack
Pedal Switch Jack
Memory Card Slot

Power Supply
AC Adaptor (DC9 V)

Current Draw
450 mA

Dimensions 
Width 1011 mm (39-13/16 inches)
Depth 289 mm (11-7/16 inches)
Height 83 mm (3-5/16 inches)

Weight
6.9 kg / 15 lbs 4 oz (excluding AC adaptor)

Accessories
Quick Start
Owner's Manual
AC Adaptor: ACI-120C, ACI-230C, ACB-230E, ACB-240(A)

Options
SmartMedia: S2M-5 / S4M-5

References

Further reading

JX-305
Polyphonic synthesizers
Digital synthesizers